In general an amplification factor is the numerical multiplicative factor by which some quantity is increased.

 In structural engineering the amplification factor is the ratio of second order to first order deflections.
 In electronics the amplification factor, or gain, is the ratio of the output to the input of an amplifier, sometimes represented by the symbol AF.
 In numerical analysis the amplification factor is a number derived using Von Neumann stability analysis to determine stability of a numerical scheme for a partial differential equation.

References 
"Developments in Tall Buildings 1983". . Page 489.
"Numerical Computation of Internal & External Flows". . Page 296.

Structural engineering